Phrynobatrachus plicatus is a species of frog in the family Petropedetidae. It is found in Côte d'Ivoire, Ghana, Guinea, Liberia, and Nigeria.

Its natural habitats are subtropical or tropical moist lowland forest, freshwater marshes, and intermittent freshwater marshes. It is threatened by habitat loss.

References

plicatus
Amphibians described in 1858
Taxonomy articles created by Polbot